Private jurisdiction is the right of an individual or a legal entity to establish courts of law. It was prevalent during feudalism.

A franchise, such as a corporation, a jurisdiction, or a right to collect certain tolls or taxes, was, in effect, a kind of property: an "incorporeal hereditament". Under English law incorporeal hereditaments (including jurisdictions) were either granted or recognized in charters. 

Franchise jurisdictions included those of manorial courts, secular courts of ecclesiastical corporations (in addition to the Church's own jurisdiction over family law), borough courts of municipal corporations, merchant courts established on markets and fairs, and mining courts of mines and mining villages.

In medieval England franchises could also be established for jurisdiction over partially or entirely privatized administrative territories such as "hundreds" and counties. Broad jurisdictional powers were also granted to many colonial corporations (such as the East India Company). 

In medieval England for many substantive areas of law the king's courts only reviewed whether the franchise courts stayed within their jurisdictional and certain procedural bounds and not the substance of the case. Generally, the only way to remove or undo the remedy of a franchise court case in royal court was to bring one of several varieties of lawsuits for trespass (tort) against the franchise court.

See also
High, middle and low justice
Zwing und Bann
Court baron
Court leet

External links
Jurisdiction as property
Jurisdiction as Property: Franchise Jurisdiction from Henry III to James I by Nicholas J. Szabo
 
Feudalism
Legal history